Maulan Mazahrul Haq Memorial Urdu senior secondary school is a high school in Gopalganj, India.

Faculty 
The medium of instruction is Hindi. It is upper primary with secondary and higher secondary education.

History 
The school was founded by Md. Nasiruddin Ahmad, who was also its first principal. It is a government School. A total of 45 batches completed in this school as of year 2018.

References 

High schools and secondary schools in Bihar
1968 establishments in Bihar
Educational institutions established in 1968
Gopalganj district, India